Paul Connaughton Jnr (born 6 January 1982) is a former Irish Fine Gael politician who served as a Teachta Dála (TD) for the Galway East constituency from 2011 to 2016.

Connaughton was a member of the Public Accounts Committee. He is from Mountbellew, County Galway, he was a member of Galway County Council for the Ballinasloe local electoral area from 2009 to 2011. His father Paul Connaughton Snr was a TD for Galway East from 1981 to 2011. He attended NUI Galway.

Connaughton lost his seat at the 2016 general election.

See also
Families in the Oireachtas

References

1982 births
Living people
Alumni of the University of Galway
Fine Gael TDs
Local councillors in County Galway
Members of the 31st Dáil
Politicians from County Galway